Korombana is a commune in the Cercle of Mopti in the Mopti Region of Mali.  It is the most northerly commune in the cercle. The commune contains 32 villages and in 2009 had a population of 29,559. The main village  (chef-lieu) is Korientzé.

References

Communes of Mopti Region